Goharbaran District is a district (bakhsh) in Miandorud County, Mazandaran Province, Iran.  At the 2006 census, its population was 14,257, in 3,882 families. The District has no cities. The District has two rural districts (dehestan): Goharbaran-e Jonubi Rural District, and Goharbaran-e Shomali Rural District.

References 

Miandorud County
Districts of Mazandaran Province